Marjon Wijnsma (born 18 July 1965 in Giekerk) is a retired Dutch heptathlete. She competed in the long jump as well. She is a four-times national champion in this discipline, whereas in the heptathlon she became Dutch champion only once.

Her personal best score was 6213 points, achieved in May 1988 in Eindhoven.

Achievements

References

1965 births
Living people
Dutch heptathletes
Dutch female long jumpers
Athletes (track and field) at the 1984 Summer Olympics
Athletes (track and field) at the 1988 Summer Olympics
Olympic athletes of the Netherlands
People from Tytsjerksteradiel
Sportspeople from Friesland
20th-century Dutch women